Paso de Indios Department is a  department of Chubut Province in Argentina.

The provincial subdivision has a population of about 1,905 inhabitants in an area of 22,300 km², and its capital city is Paso de Indios, which is located around 1,729 km from the Capital federal.

Settlements

Los Altares
Cerro Cóndor
Paso de Indios

External links

Latitud Barrilete site 

Departments of Chubut Province